Princess Kishi (929–985, 徽子女王, also Yoshiko Joō 承香殿女御 Jokyōden Joō or 斎宮女御 Saigū no Nyōgo) was a Japanese Waka poet of the middle Heian period.  She is one of only five women numbered as one of the Thirty-six Poetry Immortals. As her name implies, she was a princess of the Imperial Family of Japan. She was one of Emperor Murakami's consorts, and gave birth to one daughter, Imperial Princess Kishi, and a son. Through her father, Imperial Prince Shigeakira, she was the granddaughter of Emperor Daigo. Prior to becoming a consort she served as Ise Priestess, chief priestess of the Ise Shrine.

Many of her poems are included in the third Japanese imperial poetry anthology, Shūi Wakashū, issued in 1006.

References

Women of medieval Japan
10th-century Japanese women writers
10th-century Japanese poets
Japanese women poets
10th-century Japanese people
Saigū